Sacral splanchnic nerves are splanchnic nerves that connect the inferior hypogastric plexus to the sympathetic trunk in the pelvis.

Structure
The sacral sympathetic nerves arise from the sacral part of the sympathetic trunk, emerging anteriorly from the ganglia.  They  travel to their corresponding side's inferior hypogastric plexus, where the preganglionic nerve fibers synapse with the postganglionic sympathetic neurons, whose fibers ascend to the superior hypogastric plexus, the aortic plexus and the inferior mesenteric plexus, where they are distributed to the anal canal.  
From the inferior hypogastric plexus, they also innervate pelvic organs and vessels.

The sacral sympathetic nerves contain a mix of preganglionic and postganglionic sympathetic fibers, but mostly preganglionic. They also contain general visceral afferent fibers.  They are found in the same region as the pelvic splanchnic nerves, which arise from the sacral spinal nerves to provide parasympathetic fibers to the inferior hypogastric plexus.

See also
 Pelvic splanchnic nerves

External links
  - "The Male Pelvis: The Posterolateral Pelvic Wall"
 

Nerves